Youssouf Sabaly (born 5 March 1993) is a professional footballer who plays as a right-back for La Liga club Real Betis. He can also play as a left-back. Born in France, he represents Senegal at international level.

Career
Sabaly made his Ligue 1 debut with Evian in the opening game of the 2013–14 season against Sochaux-Montbéliard, playing the full game, which ended in a 1–1 draw.

In August 2016, he agreed to a contract extension until 2020, before joining Bordeaux on a season-long loan.

On 7 June 2021, Sabaly signed for La Liga club Real Betis on a free transfer, effective from 1 July.

International career
Sabaly was born in France to Senegalese parents. He has represented France at various youth levels, and was a member of the victorious squad at the 2013 FIFA U-20 World Cup.

In 2017, Sabaly received his first call-up from Senegal. He made his debut in a 2–0 2018 FIFA World Cup qualification win over South Africa on 10 November 2017.

In May 2018, he was named in Senegal's 23-man squad for the 2018 FIFA World Cup in Russia.

Subsequently, Sabaly was called up to the 2019 Africa Cup of Nations, where Senegal finished as runners-up after a 1-0 defeat to Algeria in the final; Sabaly would end up being elected into the team of the tournament.

Career statistics

Club

International

Honours
Paris Saint-Germain U19

 Championnat National U19: 2010–11

Betis
Copa del Rey: 2021–22

Individual
UEFA European Under-17 Championship Team of the Tournament: 2010 
Africa Cup of Nations Team of the Tournament: 2019

References

External links

Profile at the Real Betis website

1993 births
Living people
People from Le Chesnay
French sportspeople of Senegalese descent
Footballers from Yvelines
Black French sportspeople
Senegalese footballers
French footballers
Association football defenders
Ligue 1 players
Championnat National 2 players
La Liga players
Paris Saint-Germain F.C. players
Thonon Evian Grand Genève F.C. players
FC Nantes players
FC Girondins de Bordeaux players
Real Betis players
French expatriate footballers
French expatriate sportspeople in Spain
Expatriate footballers in Spain
France youth international footballers
Senegal international footballers
2018 FIFA World Cup players
2019 Africa Cup of Nations players
2022 FIFA World Cup players